The Roman Catholic Diocese of Barbastro-Monzón is located in north-eastern Spain, in the province of Huesca, part of the autonomous community of Aragón. The diocese forms part of the ecclesiastical province of Zaragoza (province), and is thus suffragan to the Archdiocese of Zaragoza.

The city of Barbastro is at the junction of the rivers Cinca and Vero. The diocese is bounded on the north by the Pyrenees, on the east and south by the Diocese of Lerida, and on the west by those of Huesca and Jaca.

The cathedral, the episcopal palace, the seminary, and the college of the Clerks Regular of the Pious Schools, or Piarists, are among the most noted buildings in Barbastro.

Besides the seminary for the education of young ecclesiastics, there are various communities in the diocese devoted to a contemplative life and the education of the young, including: the Piarists, the Sons of the Immaculate Heart of Mary, the Poor Clares, and the Capuchin nuns have foundations in the capital, the Benedictines in the town of Pueyo, and the Discalced Carmelites in Graus and Salas Altas. There are schools in all the towns of the diocese.

History

Diocese of Barbastro-Roda (1101–1149)

With the Umayyad invasion of Spain in the 8th century the Moor's northward push led to the fall of Lerida, in 716, whereupon the Diocese of Lerida was removed to Roda de Isabena. By the 12th century, the Reconquest of Spain, pushed the borders back south again, such that Lerida was able to reassume control of its diocese, after 300 years, and Barbastro was strategically chosen to take over the episcopal see from Roda. In 1101, King Pedro I sent Barbastro's first bishop, Poncio, to Rome to obtain the Pope's permission for the transfer, which was approved.

Diocese of Lerida (1149 – 16th century)

In 1149, the Moors in Lerida were vanquished by Count Ramon Berenguer IV of Barcelona and the city regained its episcopal seat and diocesan control of lands.

Diocese of Barbastro (1571–1995)

Barbastro was annexed to the Diocese of Huesca in the sixteenth century, but in 1571 the Diocese of Barbastro was erected out of part of Huesca.

The Concordat of 1851 annexed it once more to Huesca, preserving its name and administration, but being administered by a vicar Apostolic.

By 1907 the diocese was composed of 154 parishes under the supervision of ten archpriests, or vicars. The population was about 240,000. The clergy numbered about 220, and there were 231 churches and 177 chapels.

In 1951 it regained its full independence.

In the twentieth century there were two modifications of the extension of the bishopric, the first in 1955 and the second in 1995 and 1998, that is, in two phases.

 Phase 1:  On September 2, 1955, 21 Aragonese parishes which, due to historical transfers, had theretofore been under the administration Lerida and Urgel, were returned to Aragonese diocesan administration, under the Bishop of Barbastro.
 Phase 2:  Forty years later, on September 17, 1995, the Archpresbyterates of Western and Eastern Ribagorza, and Cinca Medio, were transferred to Aragonese administration.

On June 15, 1998, the remaining parishes in the counties of Bajo Cinca and La Litera were transferred. In that same act, the Church of Santa María del Romeral de Monzón became a Co-cathedral within the Diocese of Barbastro-Monzon. 

At the end of this phased transfer process, the bishopric went from 30,000 faithful and 153 parishes to 100,000 and 264 parishes.

At present the diocese is composed of four Archpresbyterates, or Deaneries:

 Lower Cinca - with 19 parishes and 26,694 inhabitants.
 Cinca Medio - with 39 parishes and 37,150 inhabitants.
 Somontano - with 25 parishes and 18,809 inhabitants.
 Sobrarbe-Ribagorza - with 159 parishes and 16,650 inhabitants.

Diocese of Barbastro-Monzón (since 1995)
As of 1995, the Diocese of Barbastro was renamed 'Diocese of Barbastro-Monzón', in accordance with the Vatican decree, Ilerdensis et Barbastrensis de finum mutatione.  It expanded to include an additional 84 parishes in Eastern Aragon which had been under the temporary administration of the Diocese of Lerida, and transferred back to Aragon under the administration of Barbastro-Monzón. In 1998, a further 27 parishes were returned to Aragonese administration.

With the return of the Parishes to Aragon, property belonging to those places of Worship, including ancient parish registers, altar reliefs, statuary, vestments and other liturgical objects and works of art, which had been stored at the Episcopal See and Seminary of Lerida should have likewise been returned.  However this did not happen and Lerida appealed to Rome to keep the property.  The Vatican tribunals declared the Aragonese parishes to be the rightful owners of their respective liturgical property and works of art and sentenced Lerida to return said property to its rightful owners and places of worship.  Lerida publicly accepted the Vatican decision but then decided not to comply with it and at the behest of Catalan authorities instead pursued a civil litigation path in order to keep the artwork.  Following the Vatican Tribunal's ruling, Lerida embarked on building a diocesan museum exhibiting only some of the Aragonese works which they refused to return.  Local partisan Catalan politics desiring promotion, territorial expansionism, and secession from the State incited anti-Catalan sentiment suggesting that the return of the Aragonese parishes to Aragonese administration was part of a strategy of cultural assimilation of the La Franja people into the Spanish-speaking mainstream congregation by cutting them off from their cultural roots.  The Catalan civil litigation process has been unsuccessful thus far, and as of 2019 is still ongoing, simply delaying the completion of the Vatican ruling, which has over the years seen the gradual and partial return of works of art to various Parishes, including the Royal Monastery of Sigena in 2017.

Bishops of Roda (until 1101)

All the names are given in Spanish:

 887–922 : Adulfo — (since before 887 to 922)
 923–955 : Atón
 955–975 : Odisendo
 988–991 : Aimerico — (since before 988 to 991)
 996---?--- : Jacobo — (since before 996)
 1006–1015 : Aimerico II — (since before 1006 to 1015)
 1017–1019 : Borrell
 1023–1067 : Arnulfo
 1068–1075 : Salomón
 1075–1076 : Arnulfo II
 1076–1094 : Pedro Ramón Dalmacio
 1094–1096 : Lupo
 1097–1100 : Poncio

In 1101 the Diocese of Roda is transferred to Barbastro.

Bishops of Barbastro-Roda (1101–1149)
In 1101 the Diocese of Roda is transferred to Barbastro.
All the names are given in Spanish:

 1101–1104 : Poncio
 1104–1126 : St. Ramón — (named Ramón II in the Catholic Encyclopedia)
 ---------1126 : Esteban
 1126–1134: Pedro Guillermo
 1134 : Ramiro, a prince of the royal house of Aragon — (Elected)
 1135–1143 : Gaufrido
 1143–1149 : Guillermo Pérez de Ravitats

In 1149 the episcopal see is moved to Lleida.

Bishops of Barbastro (1571–1995)
In 1571 the Diocese of Barbastro is erected out of part of the  Diocese of Huesca.

 1573–1585 : Felipe de Urriés y Urriés
 1585–1595 : Miguel Cercito Bereterra
 1596–1603 : Carlos Muñoz Serrano
 1604–1616 : Juan Moriz de Salazar
 1616–1622 : Jerónimo Bautista Lanuza
 1622–1625 : Pedro Apaolaza Ramírez
 1625–1639 : Alonso de Requesens y Fenollet
 1640–1643 : Bernardo Lacabra
 1643–1647 : Diego Chueca
 1647–1656 : Miguel de Escartín Arbeza
 1656–1673 : Diego Francés de Urritigoyti y Lerma
 1673–1680 : Iñigo Royo Lasierra
 1681–1695 : Francisco López de Urraca
 1695–1696 : Jerónimo López
 1696–1699 : José Martínez del Villar
 1700–1708 : Francisco de Paula Garcés y Marcilla
 1708–1714 : Pedro Gregorio Padilla
 1714–1717 : Pedro Teodoro Granel Montfort
 1717–1739 : Carlos Alamán y Ferrer
 1739–1747 : Francisco Antonio Bustamante Jiménez
 1748–1750 : Benito Marín
 1750–1755 : Juan Ladrón de Guevara y Pérez de la Torre
 1755–1766 : Diego Rivera y Fernández de Veguera
 1766–1772 : Felipe Perales Mercado
 1773–1789 : Juan Manuel Cornel Larriba
 1790–1813 : Agustín Iñigo Abad y Lasierra
 1815–1828 : Juan Nepomuceno de Lera y Cano
 1828-1855 : Jaime Fort y Puig
 1855–1896 : See administered by Capitular Vicars, Sede vacante (Vicarios Capitulares: 1855-1862 : Basilio Gil Bueno, 1862-1881 : Francisco Rufas Corz, 1881-1892 : Juan Antonio Puicercús Abizanda, 1893-1896 : José Laplana Matheo).
 1896–1898 : Casimiro Piñera y Naredo — (Obispo titular de Anchialón y Apostolic Administrator de Barbastro)
 1898–1905 : Juan Antonio Ruano y Martín — (Apostolic Administrator), born at Gijude del Barro, in the Diocese of Salamanca, 3 Nov., 1848, appointed titular bishop of Claudiopolis, and Administrator of Barbastro, 3 Nov., 1898 and transferred to Lleida, 14 Dec., 1905.
 1907–1917 : Isidoro Badia y Sarradell — (Obispo titular de Ascalón y Apostolic Administrator de Barbastro)
 1918–1926 : Emilio Jiménez Pérez — (Obispo titular de Antedón y Apostolic Administrator de Barbastro)
 1927–1935 : Nicanor Mutiloa e Irurita — (Obispo titular de Querapolis y Apostolic Administrator de Barbastro)
 1935-1936 : Florentino Asensio Barroso — (Obispo titular de Eurea de Epiro y Apostolic Administrator de Barbastro)
 1938-1946 : Lino Rodrigo Ruesca - (Obispo de Huesca y Apostolic Administrator de Barbastro)
 1946–1950 : Arturo Tabera Araoz — (Obispo titular de Lirbe y Apostolic Administrator de Barbastro)
 02/02/1950 - 13/05/1950 : Arturo Tabera Araoz - (Obispo electo de Barbastro)
 1950-1952 : Arturo Tabera Araoz - ( Obispo de Albacete y Apostolic Administrator de Barbastro)
 1951–1953 : Pedro Cantero Cuadrado
 1954–1959 : Segundo García de Sierra y Méndez
 1960–1970 : Jaime Flores Martín
 1970–1974 : Damián Iguacen Borau
 1974–1995 : Ambrosio Echebarría Arroita

Bishops of Barbastro-Monzón (since 1995)

 1995–1999 : Ambrosio Echebarría Arroita
 1999–2004 : Juan José Omella Omella
 2004–2014 : Alfonso Milián Sorribas
 2014−present : Ángel Javier Pérez Pueyo

See also
 List of the Roman Catholic dioceses of Spain.

References
This article draws only from other Wikipedia articles and these three sources:
  Catholic Encyclopedia, 1907 and 1910: "Barbastro" and "Lerida"
  IBERCRONOX: Obispado de Barbastro-Monzón

Notes

Aragon
Barbastro-Monzon
1571 establishments in Spain